Mezhdunarodnaya (literally - international) is a Saint Petersburg Metro station on the Frunzensko-Primorskaya Line (Line 5) of the Saint Petersburg Metro. It was opened on December 28, 2012 together with Bukharestskaya as an extension of the Frunzensko-Primorskaya Line. It was the southeastern terminus of the line until 3 October 2019, when an extension of the line to the south with three stations, Prospekt Slavy, Dunayskaya, and Shushary, was opened.

Mezhdunarodnaya is built under the corner of Bukharestskaya Street and Bely Kuna Street, in Frunzensky District. The name of the station means International and originates from the fact that many streets in the area (including these two) have been named to commemorate Eastern European politicians or cities.

Mezhdunarodnaya is a column-wall station. The construction started in 1986 but was frozen, and restarted in the 2000s. It was originally planned to be opened in August 2012, but the opening was postponed until December 2012, since the escalators were not delivered on time.

The entrance to the station is built into a shopping mall that goes under the similar name - "Mezhdunarodny".

Transport 
Buses: 12, 31, 54, 91, 95, 856. Trolleybuses: 35, 36. Trams: 25, 43, 45, 49.

References 

Saint Petersburg Metro stations
Railway stations in Russia opened in 2012
Railway stations located underground in Russia